Evgeny Shtaiger (born June 3, 1981) is a Russian professional ice hockey defenceman. He is currently playing in Kazakhstan with Beibarys Atyrau.

Shtaiger made his Kontinental Hockey League debut playing with HC Lada Togliatti during the inaugural 2008–09 KHL season.

References

External links

1981 births
Living people
HC Lada Togliatti players
HC Sibir Novosibirsk players
Metallurg Novokuznetsk players
Russian ice hockey defencemen
SKA Saint Petersburg players
Traktor Chelyabinsk players
People from Novokuznetsk
Sportspeople from Kemerovo Oblast